puhutv is a Turkish entertainment and video on demand  launched in December, 2016 in Istanbul. It is owned by Doğuş Media Group and offers variety of Turkish TV series. Puhutv entered the content-production industry in 2017, debuting its first series, Fi.

All the content is free and ad-supported, there is no paid version. Registration is optional, also Facebook login is available.

List of original content 
 Fi / Çi (2017–2018)
 Dip (2018)
 Şahsiyet (2018)

History 
Doğuş Group previously launched a similar service called "Sipru" in 2007. "Sipru TV" has been shut down a few years later, however "Sipru RD" for radio service is still available as an iOS application.

Competitors 
After the web site launched, similar services followed. Doğan Media Group opened netd about one month after. Also, Apple iTunes Store opened for Turkey in December 4, 2012 only for music and films. TTNET also has a similar subscription-based service, Tivibu.

References 

Turkish entertainment websites
Internet properties established in 2012